In mathematics, especially functional analysis, a bornology on a set X is a collection of subsets of X satisfying axioms that generalize the notion of boundedness. One of the key motivations behind bornologies and bornological analysis is the fact that bornological spaces provide a convenient setting for homological algebra in functional analysis. This is becausepg 9 the category of bornological spaces is additive, complete, cocomplete, and has a tensor product adjoint to an internal hom, all necessary components for homological algebra.

History

Bornology originates from functional analysis. There are two natural ways of studying the problems of functional analysis: one way is to study notions related to topologies (vector topologies, continuous operators, open/compact subsets, etc.) and the other is to study notions related to boundedness (vector bornologies, bounded operators, bounded subsets, etc.). 

For normed spaces, from which functional analysis arose, topological and bornological notions are distinct but complementary and closely related. 
For example, the unit ball centered at the origin is both a neighborhood of the origin and a bounded subset. 
Other times, the distinction between topological and bornological notions may even be unnecessary. 
For example, for linear maps between normed spaces, being continuous (a topological notion) is equivalent to being bounded (a bornological notion). 
Although the distinction between topology and bornology is often blurred or unnecessary for normed space, it becomes more important when studying generalizations of normed spaces. 
Nevertheless, bornology and topology can still be thought of as two necessary, distinct, and complementary aspects of one and the same reality. 

The general theory of topological vector spaces arose first from the theory normed spaces and then bornology emerged this general theory of topological vector spaces, although bornology has since become recognized as a fundamental notion in functional analysis. 
Born from the work of George Mackey (after whom Mackey spaces are named), the importance of bounded subsets first became apparent in duality theory, especially because of the Mackey–Arens theorem and the Mackey topology. 
Starting around the 1950s, it became apparent that topological vector spaces were inadequate for the study of certain major problems. 
For example, the multiplication operation of some important topological algebras was not continuous, although it was often bounded. 
Other major problems for which TVSs were found to be inadequate was in developing a more general theory of differential calculus, generalizing distributions from (the usual) scalar-valued distributions to vector or operator-valued distributions, and extending the holomorphic functional calculus of Gelfand (which is primarily concerted with Banach algebras or locally convex algebras) to a broader class of operators, including those whose spectra is not compact. 
Bornology has been found to be a useful tool for investigating these problems and others, including problems in algebraic geometry and general topology.

Definitions

A  on a set is a cover of the set that is closed under finite unions and taking subsets. Elements of a bornology are called .

 Stated in plain English, this says that subsets of bounded sets are bounded.
 Assuming (1), this condition may be replaced with: For every   In plain English, this says that every point is bounded.
 In plain English, this says that the union of two bounded sets is a bounded set.

Thus a bornology can equivalently be defined as a downward closed cover that is closed under binary unions.
A bornology on a set  can thus be equivalently defined as an ideal that covers  

In particular, the empty set is always bounded. 

Bases and subbases

Every base for a bornology is also a subbase for it.

Generated bornology

It is readily verified that such an intersection will also be closed under (subset) inclusion and finite unions and thus will be a bornology on  

It is equal to the intersection of all bornologies on  that contain  as a subset. 

Bounded maps

that is, if for every  

Since the composition of two locally bounded map is again locally bounded, it is clear that the class of all bounded structures forms a category whose morphisms are bounded maps. 

Characterizations

Then the following statements are equivalent:
 is a (locally) bounded map;

 takes bounded disks to bounded disks;

 maps null sequences (that is, sequences converging to the origin ) into bounded subsets of

Examples of bounded maps

If  is a continuous linear operator between two topological vector spaces (they need not even be Hausdorff), then it is a bounded linear operator (when  and  have their von-Neumann bornologies). 
The converse is in general false.

A sequentially continuous map  between two TVSs is necessarily locally bounded.

General constructions

Discrete bornology

If  is a bounded structure then (because bornologies are downward closed)  is the discrete bornology if and only if 

Indiscrete bornology

It is the coarsest bornology on  meaning that it is a subset of every bornology on  

Sets of bounded cardinality

More generally, for any infinite cardinal  the set of all subsets of  having cardinality at most  is a bornology on

Inverse image bornology

Let  be a set,  be an -indexed family of bounded structures, and let  be an -indexed family of maps where  for every  
The   on  determined by these maps is the strongest bornology on  making each  locally bounded. 
This bornology is equal to

Direct image bornology

Let  be a set,  be an -indexed family of bounded structures, and let  be an -indexed family of maps where  for every  
The   on  determined by these maps is the weakest bornology on  making each  locally bounded. 

Subspace bornology

Suppose that  is a bounded structure and  be a subset of  

Product bornology

Let  be an -indexed family of bounded structures, let  and for each  let  denote the canonical projection. 
That is, it is the strongest bornology on  making each of the canonical projections locally bounded. 
A base for the product bornology is given by

Topological constructions

Compact bornology

A subset of a topological space  is called relatively compact if its closure is a compact subspace of  
Every continuous map between T1 spaces is bounded with respect to their compact bornologies. 

The set of relatively compact subsets of  form a bornology on  A base for this bornology is given by all closed intervals of the form  for

Metric bornology

Given a metric space  the  consists of all subsets  such that the supremum  is finite. 

Similarly, given a measure space  the family of all measurable subsets  of finite measure (meaning ) form a bornology on

Closure and interior bornologies

The bornology  is called  if  

We necessarily have 

The bornology  is called  if it satisfies any of the following equivalent conditions: 
the closed subsets of  generate ; 
the closure of every  belongs to  
The bornology  is called  if  is both open and closed.

The topological space  is called  or just  if every  has a neighborhood that belongs to 
Every compact subset of a locally bounded topological space is bounded.

Bornology of a topological vector space

In any locally convex TVS  the set of all closed bounded disks forms a base for the usual bornology of  

A linear map between two bornological spaces is continuous if and only if it is bounded (with respect to the usual bornologies).

Topological rings

Suppose that  is a commutative topological ring. 

See also

References

  
 
  
  
  
  

Functional analysis
Topological vector spaces